The Journey is the sixth studio album by Australian guitarist Tommy Emmanuel. Released in September 1993, the album peaked at number 5 on the ARIA Charts; becoming Emmanuel's first top ten album. The album was certified double platinum in Australia in 1994.

The album was re-released in 1994 with additional tracks under the title The Journey Continues which peaked at number 18 on the ARIA charts itself.

At the ARIA Music Awards of 1994, the album won the ARIA Award for Best Adult Contemporary Album.

Track listing

NB: Track 12, "Amy" appears on the 1993 Australian CD release. It was replaced by "Initiation" (4:17) for the US and Canadian releases.

The Journey Continues

Personnel
 Tommy Emmanuel – guitar, bass, percussion
 Stan Martin – trumpet, flugelhorn, horn arrangements
 Andy Martin – trombone
 Scott Martin – saxophone
 Kevin Savigar – musette
 Rick Neigher – keyboards
 Jerry Goodman – violin
 Chet Atkins – guitar
 Joe Walsh – guitar, slide guitar
 Abraham Laboriel – bass guitar
 Doane Perry – drums
 Carlos Vega – drums

Charts

Certifications

References

1993 albums
ARIA Award-winning albums
Tommy Emmanuel albums